This is a list of books and monographs by the American geneticist Thomas Hunt Morgan. Morgan produced 22 books on embryology, genetics and evolution. Books are in order by date. Three of Morgan's co-authors have their own articles: Calvin Bridges, Alfred Sturtevant and Hermann Joseph Muller.

The Development of the Frog's Egg: An Introduction to Experimental Embryology, New York: Macmillan, 1897. Translated into German by Bernhard Solger and published in 1904 as Die Entwicklung des Froscheies..
Regeneration Columbia University Biological Series, New York: Macmillan, 1901.
Evolution and Adaptation, New York: Macmillan, 1903.
Experimental Zoology, New York: Macmillan, 1907
Heredity and Sex, New York: Columbia University Press, 1913.
The Mechanism of Mendelian Heredity, with A.H. Sturtevant, H.J. Muller and C.B. Bridges, New York:Henry Holt, 1915. Revised and re-issued in 1922.
A Critique of the Theory of Evolution, Princeton NJ: Princeton University Press, 1916.
Sex-linked Inheritance in Drosophila, with C.B. Bridges, Washington DC: Carnegie Institution, 1916.
The Genetic and the Operative Evidence of Relating to Secondary Sexual Characteristics, Washington DC: Carnegie Institution, 1919
The Physical Basis of Heredity, Monographs on Experimental Biology, Philadelphia: J.B. Lippincott, 1919.
Contributions to the Genetics of Drosophila Melanogaster, with A.H.Sturtevant and C.B.Bridges: Carnegie Institution of Washington, 1919.
Some Possible Bearings of Genetics on Pathology, Lancaster PA: New Era Printing Co., 1922
The Third-Chromosome Group of Mutant Characters of Drosophila melanogaster, with C.B. Bridges, Washington DC: Carnegie Institution, 1923
Laboratory Directions for and Elementary Course in Genetics, with H.J. Muller, A.H. Sturtevant and C.B. Bridges, New York: Henry Holt, 1923
Human Inheritance, Pittsburgh:University of Pittsburgh School of Medicine, 1924
Evolution and Genetics, Princeton NJ: Princeton University Press, 1925
The Theory of the Gene, New Haven: Yale University Press, 1926
Genetics and the Physiology of Development, Woods Hole: Marine Biological Laboratory, 1926
Experimental Embryology, New York: Columbia University Press, 1927
What is Darwinism?, New York: W.H. Norton, 1929
The Scientific Basis of Evolution, New York: W.H. Norton, 1932
Embryology and Genetics, New York: Columbia University Press, 1934

See also
List of publications in science

Bibliographies by writer
Biology books
Bibliographies of American writers
Science bibliographies